Master of the Mix is a reality television series and disc jockey competition. The 2010 season of the show had eight episodes and seven disc jockeys.  The show was hosted by Just Blaze and judged by Kid Capri. Biz Markie was a regular guest.  The contestants were DJ Jazzy Joyce, Rich Medina, Vikter Duplaix, DJ Scratch, DJ Rap, DJ Revolution, and DJ Mars. The show aired half-hour episodes on Wednesday nights on the Centric television network with encore Saturday airings on Black Entertainment Television.  The show, which debuted on November 3, 2010, is presented by Smirnoff.

Ben Silverman announced in September 2010 that his production company, Electus, in partnership with branded entertainment agency GTM,  would produce the show with financing from Diageo, parent of Smirnoff.  The private screening premier on was held in New York City on November 2 and was attended by various luminaries in the Hip Hop music industry such as Grandmaster Flash.

The seven competitors have various wide-ranging experiences.  Some have Grammy Award nomination; others have sold millions of albums; some have worked with some of the most popular current recording artists in the world. Among the DJs are the DJs of the Rock Steady Crew and EPMD.  During the series the DJs compete in various challenges at venues across the world and most episodes will have eliminations.  The surviving DJ who is chosen as "Master of the Mix" will win the sponsorship of Smirnoff as their official DJ at international Smirnoff-sponsored events for an entire year. The total value of the prize package, which includes custom-made Smirnoff bottle is $250,000.

Season 1 (2010)
The season begins in Miami, Florida at a posh residence.  Although there was a competition, 3 DJ's were eliminated in the first episode.  In the second week, DJ Dimepiece was eliminated in a challenge at a Las Vegas club where the DJ's competed without being able to see the audience.

Contestants

Episodes

Season 2 (2011–2012)
The season begins with auditions in Los Angeles, California, Houston, Texas, Miami, Florida, Atlanta, Georgia, New York City, New York and Detroit, Michigan.

Contestants

Episodes

Season 3 (2013)
The season begins with final auditions at Club Frequency in Miami, Florida.

Contestants

Episodes

References

External links

Official website at VH1

Master of the Mix Episodes on TVGuide.com
 Master of the Mix at Thefutoncritic.com

2010 American television series debuts
2013 American television series endings
2010s American reality television series
BET original programming
DJing
English-language television shows
VH1 original programming